High-energy-density matter (HEDM) is a class of energetic materials, particularly fuel, with a high ratio of potential chemical energy output to density, usually termed "thrust-to-weight ratio", hence "high energy density".  The substances are extremely reactive, therefore potentially dangerous, and some consider them impractical.  Researchers are looking into HEDM that can provide much more lift than the current liquid hydrogen-liquid oxygen reactions used in today's spacecraft.

See also
Energy density
Oxygen rings

References 
https://fas.org/spp/military/docops/usaf/2020/app-i.htm

Energy storage
Fuels